A kiang is a large mammal belonging to the horse family.

Kiang may also refer to:
 3751 Kiang, a main-belt asteroid
 Kiang (Gambia), a region in the Gambia
 C. S. Kiang (fl. 1978–2006), academic in physics and atmospheric sciences
 Nelson Kiang (fl. 1952–1990s), academic in auditory physiology

See also
 Horse
 Tsao-kiang, a Chinese gunboat
 Unicorn
 USS Ta-Kiang (1862), a Union Navy steamer during the American Civil War
 Wild ass (disambiguation)